Blue Tent Creek is a stream in the U.S. state of California. The stream flows for  before it empties into the Sacramento River.

Two traditions attempt to explain the name "Blue Tent Creek": firstly, it may derive its name from the blue tent of a local prospector; secondly that it was named after a blue tent which was a landmark on a local stagecoach route.

References

Rivers of California
Rivers of Tehama County, California